Guylaine Marchand (born 1 June 1969) is a French adaptive rower who competes in international elite competitions. She is a World champion in mixed double sculls with Fabien Saint-Lannes, a World and European bronze medalist in the mixed coxed four. She competed at the 2016 Summer Paralympics in mixed coxed four but did not medal.

References

External links
 

1969 births
Living people
People from La Flèche
French female rowers
Paralympic rowers of France
Rowers at the 2016 Summer Paralympics
World Rowing Championships medalists for France
Sportspeople from Sarthe
21st-century French women
20th-century French women